Buildering (also known as edificeering, urban climbing, structuring, skywalking,  boulding, or stegophily) describes the act of climbing on the outside of buildings and other artificial structures. The word "buildering", sometimes misspelled bildering, combines the word building with the climbing term bouldering. If done without ropes or protection far off the ground, buildering is extremely dangerous. It is often practiced outside legal bounds, and is thus practiced mostly at night.

Night climbing is a particular branch of buildering which has been practiced for many years in a variety of locations, especially at the Universities of Oxford and Cambridge, England. Night climbing, as distinct from buildering, is performed mainly by undergraduates under cover of darkness. The term "night climbing" has replaced the older term "roof climbing". The philosophy behind night climbing has undergone great change during the 21st century, with urban disciplines such as parkour having a heavy influence on the evolution of night climbing techniques and movements.

Adepts of buildering who are seen climbing on buildings without authorization are regularly met by police forces upon completing their exploit. Spectacular acts of buildering, such as free soloing skyscrapers, are usually accomplished by lone, experienced climbers, sometimes attracting large crowds of passers-by and media attention. These remain relatively rare.

Buildering can also take a form more akin to bouldering, which tends towards ascending or traversing shorter sections of buildings and structures. While still generally frowned upon by property owners, some, such as the University of Colorado at Boulder and Tufts University, turn a blind eye towards the practice in many locations.

Although often practised as a solo sport, buildering has also become a popular group activity. As in more traditional rock climbing, routes are established and graded for difficulty.

History

In 1895, the great alpinist Geoffrey Winthrop Young, started to climb the roofs of Cambridge University, England. Students had been scrambling up the university architecture for years, but Young was the first to document this activity. He wrote and published a buildering guide to Trinity College. Then in 1905, while a master at Eton College, Young produced another small volume on buildering, spoofing mountaineering.

In 1905, Harry H. Gardiner began buildering. He successfully climbed over 700 buildings in Europe and North America, usually wearing ordinary street clothes and using no special equipment.

In 1910, George Polley started his climbing career when the owner of a clothing store promised him a suit if he would climb to the roof of the building. He succeeded, and went on to climb over 2,000 buildings.

During the years from 1915 to 1920, buildering in New York City reached its peak. Before 1915, there were few skyscrapers in New York City, and after 1920, the city authorities had legislated to outlaw buildering.  During this era, a number of daredevils climbed the tall buildings, but several of them fell to their deaths in the attempt.

In 1921, a group of undergraduates from St John's College, Cambridge, published a buildering guide to that college.

In 1930, John Hurst wrote the second edition of Geoffrey Winthrop Young's buildering guide to Trinity.

In 1937, a comprehensive and lighthearted account of Cambridge night climbing (undergraduate buildering) appeared in popular print, written by Noël Howard Symington, under the pseudonym "Whipplesnaith".

In 1947, John Ciampa scaled the exterior of the Astor Hotel in New York City.

In 1960, Richard Williams wrote the third edition of the Trinity buildering guide. Night climbing remained popular in Cambridge during these post-war years. In 1970, a book entitled "Night Climbing in Cambridge" was published under the pseudonym "Hederatus".  Buildering also featured prominently in a book by F A Reeve, published in 1977.

In 1977, George Willig climbed the South Tower of the World Trade Center.

In the 1980s, Dan Goodwin scaled many of the world's tallest buildings, including the World Trade Center, the Sears Tower, the John Hancock Center, the CN Tower, and most recently (1 March 2014) the Telephonica Building in Santiago, Chile for Stan Lee's Superhumans

In the 1990s and the following decade, Alain Robert became the world's most famous builderer by free soloing high buildings all over the globe.

In 2007, buildering in Cambridge was featured in a detective novel by Jill Paton Walsh.

Between 2007 and 2011, several books on night climbing were published by Oleander Press, of Cambridge.  In 2007, they reprinted the Whipplesnaith book. In 2009, they reprinted Geoffrey Winthrop Young's first edition of the Trinity Guide, and the St John's Guide.  In 2010, they reprinted John Hurst's second edition of the Trinity Guide, as well as Young's book "Wall and Roof Climbing".  In 2011, they published an omnibus edition of the three Trinity guides, including an introduction by Richard Williams which reviewed the history of night climbing in Cambridge from the 18th century to the present day.  This introduction removed the cloak of anonymity that had previously protected the identities of the first nocturnal explorers.

From around 2008, buildering (also known as "roofing") became popular amongst teenagers and young adults in eastern European countries including Russia and Ukraine. They shared footage of their achievements on video portals such as YouTube (Mustang Wanted).

In 2013, the History Press published a book on the history of student pranks at Trinity College Dublin, which featured a full chapter on the university's long-standing night climbing tradition, including the bouldering activities of the Dublin University Climbing Club.

In August 2016, a young man going by the name Stephen Rogata attempted to scale New York City's 68-storey Trump Tower using climbing gear and giant suction cups; NYPD officers apprehended him at the 21st floor.

Famous builderers

Alain Robert has achieved world-wide renown and is widely regarded as the greatest of all builderers. In 2011, he climbed the world's tallest building, the 830-meter Burj Khalifa tower in Dubai.  On that occasion, he used a harness in accordance with safety procedure, but most of his climbs have been free soloing.  Other well-known structures that Robert has climbed include the Empire State Building in New York City, the Golden Gate Bridge in San Francisco, the Sears Tower in Chicago, the Jin Mao Tower in Shanghai, The Doha Torch in Doha, Taipei 101 in Taiwan, and each of the Petronas Towers in Kuala Lumpur, Malaysia. He has also climbed a number of famous landmarks, including the Eiffel Tower and the Montparnasse Tower in France, and the Sydney Opera House in Australia. Robert has been arrested at the top of many of the major buildings he has climbed. He was born in France in 1962 as Robert Alain Phillipe, and is popularly known as "the French Spider-Man" and the "Human Spider".

In the 1980s, Dan Goodwin, aka SpiderDan, aka Skyscraperman, in advocacy for high-rise firefighting and rescue, scaled many of the world's tallest buildings and structures including the Sears Tower, the John Hancock Center, the North Tower of the World Trade Center, the Parque Central Complex in Caracas, Venezuela, and the CN Tower in Toronto, Canada. In 2010, Goodwin, now a stage four cancer survivor, scaled San Francisco, California's sixty-storey Millennium Tower to call attention to the fire department's inability to conduct rescue operations in the upper floors of skyscrapers.

At least seven builderers became known as "The Human Fly", all from the United States, as follows:

 George Willig, who climbed the South Tower of the World Trade Center in 1977. Like Alain Robert, he was also known as "Spider-Man", after the comic hero who was first published by Marvel in 1962.
 John Ciampa, who climbed between 1942 and 1952. He was a stuntman and entertainer, and was also known as the "Flying Phantom" and the "Brooklyn Tarzan".
 James A Dearing, who scaled the Rutherford County Courthouse in 1923, but fell to his death after completing the climb.  His stage name was Roy Royce.
 Harry F Young, who was hired in 1923 to climb the Hotel Martinique in New York City, to promote the silent movie Safety Last!  He lost his grip on the ascent, and fell nine stories to his death.
 George Polley, who climbed between 1910 and 1920.  He died at the age of 29 from a brain tumour.
 Harry Gardiner, who climbed over 700 buildings in the United States and Europe between 1905 and 1918, usually wearing street clothes and tennis shoes, with no climbing equipment.
 James Lotito, in 2020 is the most recent builderer to be dubbed "human fly". He has scaled many buildings and structures unaided, but is most known for an unsuccessful attempt in Manhattan.

In the 1930s, Whipplesnaith (Noël Symington) climbed many buildings in Cambridge, England.

See also

Alain Robert
BASE jumping
Urban exploration
Night climbing in Cambridge
Doorways in the Sand
Parkour
Safety Last!
The Night Climbers of Oxford
The Night Climbers of Cambridge
Assassin's Creed
Mirror's Edge
Uncharted

References

External links
Alain Robert Official website
BBC announces Ascent of the Arche de la Defence
Buildering.net
Buildering.ru A directory of buildering spots
FreakClimbing Buildering Gallery

Locations
Cambridge University, England
Denmark
Germany
Rotterdam, Netherlands videos
Milan, Italy - Street Boulder Contest 
Oxford University, England
Vancouver, Canada 5th Annual UBC Buildering Contest
University of California, Berkeley
Buildering in Montréal

Types of climbing
Urban exploration